Pristimantis tamsitti is a species of frog in the family Strabomantidae.
It is endemic to Colombia.
Its natural habitats are tropical moist montane forests and rivers.
It is threatened by habitat loss.

References

tamsitti
Amphibians of Colombia
Endemic fauna of Colombia
Amphibians described in 1970
Taxonomy articles created by Polbot